Martina Navratilova and Pam Shriver were the defending champions but did not compete that year.

Patty Fendick and Jill Hetherington won in the final 7–6, 5–7, 6–4 against Gigi Fernández and Robin White.

Seeds
Champion seeds are indicated in bold text while text in italics indicates the round in which those seeds were eliminated. The top four seeded teams received byes into the second round.

Draw

Final

Top half

Bottom half

References
 1988 Virginia Slims of Los Angeles Doubles Draw

1988,Doubles
1988 WTA Tour
1988 in sports in California
1988 in American tennis